Statistics of the Chinese Taipei National Football League for the 1997 season.

Overview
It was contested by 8 teams, and Taipower won the championship.

League standings

References
Chinese Taipei - List of final tables (RSSSF)

Chinese Taipei National Football League seasons
1
Taipei
Taipei